Clayton M. Clemens is a Chancellor Professor of Government and Assistant Chair of the Government Department at the College of William and Mary in Williamsburg, Virginia, United States.

His research specialization is German politics and foreign policy. He is the editor of The Kohl Chancellorship (Frank Cass/1998) and NATO and the Quest for Post-Cold War Security (St. Martin's/1997). His articles have appeared in West European Politics, German Politics, International Affairs, and Armed Forces and Society.

Originally from Utah, Clemens received his undergraduate degree from the College of William and Mary in 1980; did his doctoral work at the Fletcher School of Law and Diplomacy, Tufts University; and has taught in the Government Department at the College of William and Mary since 1985.

In 1990-91 Professor Clemens received an International Affairs Fellowship from the Council on Foreign Relations and served as a political analyst at the United States Embassy in Bonn, Germany. He was a guest professor at the University of Potsdam, in eastern Germany, in the summer of 1992. In 1992 the German Historical Institute awarded him the Alois Mertes Memorial Lectureship.

He has been asked to speak as the faculty representative at the annual senior Candlelight ceremony more than ten times.

References

Year of birth missing (living people)
Living people
American foreign policy writers
American male non-fiction writers
American political writers
American book editors
College of William & Mary alumni
College of William & Mary faculty
American political scientists